Events from the year 1891 in Sweden

Incumbents
 Monarch – Oscar II
 Prime Minister – Gustaf Åkerhielm, Erik Gustaf Boström.

Events

 15 February – Allmänna Idrottsklubben (AIK) (Swedish Sports Club) is founded.
 10 July – Erik Gustaf Boström becomes Prime Minister 
 Göteborgs högskola established
 AIK Bandy
 Djurgårdens IF Bandy
 Skansen
 Swedish Saw Mill Industry Workers Union
 Under röd flagg
 Ursholmen

Births
 3 September – Curt Hartzell, gymnast (died 1975).
 13 October – Helge Bäckander, gymnast (died 1958).
 28 November – Gustaf Dyrssen, military officer (died 1981).

Exact date missing 
 Sten Selander, botanist and fiction writer (died 1957).

Deaths

 11 January Carl Johan Thyselius politician (born 1811)
 6 September – Elise Arnberg, miniaturist and photographer (born 1891)

References

 
Sweden
Years of the 19th century in Sweden